Chebaki is a rural locality (a village) in Dvurechenskoye Rural Settlement, Permsky District, Perm Krai, Russia. The population was 3 as of 2010. There are 3 streets.

Geography 
Chebaki is located 36 km southeast of Perm (the district's administrative centre) by road. Rassolnaya is the nearest rural locality.

References 

Rural localities in Permsky District